Bolkhuny is a rural locality (a selo) in Akhtubinsky District, Astrakhan Oblast, Russia. The population was 2,202 as of 2010. There are 76 streets.

Geography 
Bolkhuny is located 44 km southeast of Akhtubinsk (the district's administrative centre) by road. Novo-Nikolayevka is the nearest rural locality.

References 

Rural localities in Akhtubinsky District